Johannes Hansen (18861961) was a Danish furniture maker and founder of the eponymous company (Johannes Hansen Møbelsnedkeri A/S) that manufactured furniture from the 1940s to the 1990s.
He was a founder and for a time the chairman of the Copenhagen Cabinet Maker's Guild.

His best-known products were designed by Hans Wegner, whom he met in 1940 and with whom he (and his company) was to collaborate for the next three decades. By that time, Hansen was in his 50s, and had a store at Bredgade 65 in Copenhagen. As the cabinetmaker, his side of the partnership with Wegner is less well known outside of Denmark.

He died in 1961. His youngest son, Poul Hansen, took over the company and continued to collaborate with Wegner. The company eventually went bankrupt in the 1990s.

References

Reference bibliography

 
 
 
 
 

20th-century Danish woodworkers
Danish furniture makers
1886 births
1961 deaths